The 1998 season in Swedish football, started January 1998 and ended December 1998.

Honours

Official titles

Competitions

Promotions, relegations and qualifications

Promotions

League transfers

Relegations

International qualifications

Domestic results

Allsvenskan 1998

Allsvenskan qualification play-off 1998

Division 1 Norra 1998

Division 1 Södra 1998

Division 1 qualification play-off 1998 
1st round

2nd round

Svenska Cupen 1997–98 
Final

National team results

References
Print

Online

 
Seasons in Swedish football